Hattiesburg station, also known as Union Station and New Orleans & Northeastern Passenger Depot, is an Amtrak intercity train station located in Hattiesburg, Mississippi, at 308 Newman Street. The station is served by Amtrak's  passenger train, and is the last regular stop before its southern terminus in New Orleans.  On June 14, 2001, the depot was selected as a Mississippi Landmark (035-HAT-0088-NRD-ML),  and in 2002, the depot was designated as a contributing resource within the Hub City Historic District (Boundary Increase) (Reference Number 02000855, listed 2002-08-09) on the National Register of Historic Places.

Description

Designed by architect Frank Pierce Milburn, and built in 1910 for the New Orleans and Northeastern Railroad, the depot is a -story brick structure of Italian Renaissance Revival architectural style.  The depot contains 14,000 square-feet (1300 square meters) of interior space, including a 4,000 square-foot (372 square meters) waiting room (Grand Hall) for passengers and has been in continuous use since 1910.  A loading platform, adjacent to the depot, is covered by a 924-foot (282 meters) canopy.

In 2000, the City of Hattiesburg acquired the depot plus approximately 3 acres (1.2 hectares), surrounding the structure, from Norfolk Southern Railway and began extensive repairs and restoration to convert the facility into an intermodal transportation center for bus and taxi service, in addition to railway.  The 5-year restoration was completed in 2007.  Funding for the $10 million renovation came from federal earmarks and grants from state, city, and private organizations.

Besides serving as an intermodal transportation center for the City of Hattiesburg, the depot’s Grand Hall is used for art exhibits, social functions, and private events.  The Grand Hall is no longer used for arrivals and departures by rail; a separate waiting area, in the depot, accommodates Amtrak passengers.

References

External links 

Hattiesburg Amtrak Station (USA Rail Guide -- Train Web)

Buildings and structures in Hattiesburg, Mississippi
Amtrak stations in Mississippi
Railway stations in the United States opened in 1910
Stations along Southern Railway lines in the United States